Jan Adam Maklakiewicz (24 November 1899, Chojnata, Congress Poland – 8 February 1954, Warsaw) was a Polish composer, conductor, critic, and music educator. His most known compositions belong to the choral music.

Selected filmography
 Pan Twardowski (1936)

References
Biography from the Polish Music Center, University of Southern California
Entry in the Encyklopedia muzyki PWN (in Polish)

1899 births
1954 deaths
20th-century classical composers
20th-century conductors (music)
20th-century male musicians
Polish composers
Polish male classical composers
Polish conductors (music)
Polish music critics
Male conductors (music)
Chopin University of Music alumni
People from Skierniewice County
Recipients of the Order of Polonia Restituta